Berry Good was a South Korean girl group formed by Asia Bridge Entertainment in 2014. The group's final line-up consisted of Johyun and Sehyung with former members being Subin, Iera, Nayeon, Daye, Taeha, Seoyul and Gowoon. They released their debut single Love Letter on May 21, 2014. They officially disbanded on May 12, 2021.

History

2014–2015: Debut and line-up changes

Berry Good debuted on May 21, 2014, with the music video for "Love Letter", a remake of the song released by Click-B in 2000. The eponymous single was released the following day, when they also started promotions on M! Countdown.

In January 2015, Asia Bridge Entertainment stated that Subin, Iera and Nayeon had left the group to concentrate on their studies, and introduced new member Seoyul, followed by Daye and Sehyung.

Their second single Because of You was released on February 9. They started promotions on February 10 on SBS MTV's The Show. In June, their representative office launched various Berry Good goods (such as accessories, clothes and cosmetics) in China.

On September 23, their third single My First Love was released. Two music videos were produced, one of which features actress Kim Bo-ra. The song, posthumous work of composer Joo Tae-young, was first performed in advance on September 20 at Hallyu Dream Concert, and promotions started on September 22 on The Show.

2016–2017: New member Johyun and further releases

On March 11, Berry Good launched a crowdfunding campaign to produce their first EP on Makestar. The  goal was reached in ten days and the campaign ultimately raised , 160.8% of its original goal. On April 20, the crowdfunded mini-album Very Berry, led by title track "Angel", was released.

Their following release was crowdfunded on Makestar as well. The project started on September 1 as a new single, but it was later upgraded to a mini album, and ended raising , 268.97% of its original 10-million goal. The group also added a sixth member, Johyun. Three out of four songs from the EP, including the lead track "Don't Believe", were showcased on Arirang Radio's K-poppin one day before their release. The official music video for "Don't Believe", and the group's second mini album Glory, were released on November 1.

A third Makestar project was launched on March 9, 2017 to finance their sixth digital single Bibbidi Bobbidi Boo. While the song was released on April 16, its music video was uploaded to the group's YouTube channel the day after. To promote Bibbidi Bobbidi Boo, Berry Good adopted a "part-timer concept", experiencing part-time works between schedules and sending proceeds to the needy. On June 9, they  performed three songs at the Thống Nhất Stadium of Ho Chi Minh City, Vietnam. 

 2018–2019: First sub-unit, first full-length album and Taeha’s departure 
Taeha, Sehyung and Gowoon debuted in the group's first sub-unit, Berry Good Heart Heart, on April 27, 2018, releasing their first single Crazy, Gone Crazy. On August 16, the group made a comeback with their first full album Free Travel, that they had been recording since August 2017. They commemorated the release through a showcase held that afternoon at Ilji Art Hall in Cheongdam-dong. After promoting the lead single "Green Apple", in September they went on with B-side "Mellow Mellow", but Sehyung sat out due to an ankle fracture; despite participating in their single This Winter, released on December 15, she was on hiatus until March 1, 2019.

On October 18, 2018, Berry Good held their first concert in Japan, at Shinjuku Blaze in Tokyo. They released their third mini-album, Fantastic, on May 25, 2019 with "Oh! Oh!" serving as the title track, as a five-member group, with Daye resting due to health issues. They started comeback promotions that same day on Show! Music Core, but, two days later, Taeha announced her contract had expired and she would no longer be in the group. Berry Good therefore discontinued the album's promotional activities.

2020–2021: Members departure and disbandment
On November 5, 2020, Berry Good returned with the new digital single "Accio" as a quartet. It was included in their fourth extended play Undying Love, which was released on January 19, 2021.

On February 22, 2021, Gowoon and Seoyul announced that their contracts have expired and they would be leaving the group.

On May 12, 2021, Berry Good officially disbanded after discussions with the remaining members. JTG Entertainment announced they've been acquired by Star Weave Entertainment, Johyun will be joining Star Weave Entertainment, while Sehyung will leave the agency.

Image and musical style
Berry Good didn't have a fixed basic image, changing it for every release. They started their career with dance tracks, before releasing their first ballad "My First Love" in September 2015. To promote "Don't Believe" in November 2016, Berry Good underwent a change of styling and concept to take off the original girlish, neat and pure image, adding EDM and tropical house elements to their music.

Members
 Subin (수빈) – rapper
 Iera (이라) – rapper
 Nayeon (나연) – vocalist
Daye (다예) – vocalist, rapper
Taeha (태하) – leader, vocalist
 Gowoon (고운) – vocalist
 Seoyul (서율) – vocalist
 Johyun (조현) – vocalist, rapper
 Sehyung (세형) – vocalist, rapperSub-units'
 Berry Good Heart Heart: Taeha, Sehyung, Gowoon

Timeline

Discography

Studio albums

Extended plays

Single albums

Singles

Soundtrack appearances

Music videos

Filmography

Reality shows

Awards and nominations

Notes

References

External links

 

Musical groups established in 2014
K-pop music groups
South Korean dance music groups
South Korean girl groups
2014 establishments in South Korea
South Korean pop music groups
Musical groups disestablished in 2021
2021 disestablishments in South Korea